{{DISPLAYTITLE:C8H7NO4}}
The molecular formula C8H7NO4 (molar mass: 181.15 g/mol) may refer to:

 3-Aminophthalic acid
 Homoquinolinic acid (HQA)
 Uvitonic acid, or 6-methyl-2,4-pyridinedicarboxylic acid

Molecular formulas